Robert Clarke (born 4 September 1967) is a Liberian former professional footballer. He played in twelve matches for the Liberia national football team from 1995 to 1997. He was also named in Liberia's squad for the 1996 African Cup of Nations tournament.

References

External links
 

1967 births
Living people
Liberian footballers
Liberia international footballers
1996 African Cup of Nations players
Place of birth missing (living people)
Association football midfielders